Volleyball at the 2019 European Youth Summer Olympic Festival was held in two venues in Azerbaijan. Volleyball matches were held at the Darnagul Arena and the MES Sport and Health Center, Baku from 22 to 27 July 2019.

Competition schedule
All times are local Azerbaijan Time (UTC+4).

Boys competition

Preliminary round

Pool A

|}

Pool B

|}

Knockout stage

Classification Stage

Girls competition

Preliminary round

PoolA

|}

Pool B

|}

Knockout stage

Classification Stage

Medal summary

Medal table

Medalists

References

External links

 
2019
European Youth Summer Olympic Festival